Thomas Fairfax, 3rd Lord Fairfax of Cameron (17 January 161212 November 1671), also known as Sir Thomas Fairfax,  was an English politician, general and Parliamentary commander-in-chief during the English Civil War. An adept and talented commander, Fairfax led Parliament to many victories, notably the crucial Battle of Naseby, becoming effectively military ruler of England, but was eventually overshadowed by his subordinate Oliver Cromwell, who was more politically adept and radical in action against Charles I. Fairfax became unhappy with Cromwell's policy and publicly refused to take part in Charles's show trial. Eventually he resigned, leaving Cromwell to control the country. Because of this, and also his honourable battlefield conduct and his active role in the Restoration of the monarchy after Cromwell's death, he was exempted from the retribution exacted on many other leaders of the revolution.

Early life
Thomas Fairfax was born at Denton Hall, halfway between Ilkley and Otley in the West Riding of Yorkshire, on 17 January 1612, the eldest son of Ferdinando Fairfax, 2nd Lord Fairfax of Cameron (his family title of Lord Fairfax of Cameron was in the peerage of Scotland, then still independent from England, which was why he was able to sit in the English House of Commons after he inherited it). His dark hair and eyes and a swarthy complexion earned him the nickname "Black Tom".

Fairfax studied at St John's College, Cambridge, and Gray's Inn (1626–1628), then volunteered to join Sir Horace Vere's expedition to fight for the Protestant cause in the Netherlands. In 1639 he commanded a troop of Yorkshire dragoons which marched with King Charles I against the Scots in the First Bishops' War, which ended with the Pacification of Berwick before any fighting took place. In the Second Bishops' War the following year, the English army was routed at the Battle of Newburn. Fairfax fled with the rest of the defeated army but was nevertheless knighted in January 1641 for his services.

Pre-Civil War events

The Fairfaxes, father and son, though serving at first under King Charles I, were opposed to the arbitrary prerogative of the Crown, and Sir Thomas declared that "his judgment was for the Parliament as the king and kingdom's great and safest council". When Charles endeavoured to raise a guard for his own person at York, intending it, as the event afterwards proved, to form the nucleus of an army, Fairfax was employed to present a petition to his sovereign, entreating him to hearken to the voice of his parliament, and to discontinue the raising of troops. This was at a great meeting of the freeholders and farmers of Yorkshire convened by the king on Heworth Moor near York. Charles attempted to ignore the petition, pressing his horse forward, but Fairfax followed him and placed the petition on the pommel of the king's saddle.

Civil War
When the civil war broke out in 1642, his father, Lord Fairfax, was appointed general of the Parliamentary forces in the north, and Sir Thomas was made lieutenant-general of the horse under him. Both father and son distinguished themselves in the campaigns in Yorkshire.

In 1643 a minor battle between Royalists for Charles I and a small group of Roundheads under Fairfax, who were en route from Tadcaster to Leeds, took place at Seacroft. Fairfax was obliged to retreat across Bramham moor and summed up the Battle of Seacroft Moor as 'the greatest loss we ever received'.

Sometimes severely defeated, but more often successful, and always energetic, prudent and resourceful, father and son contrived to keep up the struggle until the crisis of 1644, when York was held by the Marquess of Newcastle against the combined forces of the English Parliamentarians and the Scots, and Prince Rupert hastened with all available forces to its relief. A gathering of eager national forces within a few square miles of ground naturally led to a battle, and Marston Moor (2 July 1644) proved decisive for the struggle in the north. The younger Fairfax bore himself with the greatest gallantry in the battle and, though severely wounded, managed to join Oliver Cromwell and the victorious cavalry on the other wing. One of his brothers, Colonel Charles Fairfax, was killed in the action. But the Marquess of Newcastle fled the kingdom, and the Royalists abandoned all hope of retrieving their affairs. The city of York was taken, and nearly the whole of the north submitted to the Parliament.

In the West, South and South West of England, however, the Royalist cause was still strong. The war had lasted two years, and the nation began to complain of the contributions that were exacted of and the excesses that were committed by the military. Dissatisfaction was expressed with the military commanders and, as a preliminary step to reform, the Self-denying Ordinance was passed. This involved the removal of the Earl of Essex from the supreme command, along with other Members of Parliament. This was followed by the New Model Ordinance, which replaced the locally raised Parliamentary regiments with a unified army. Sir Thomas Fairfax was selected as the new Lord General, with Cromwell as his Lieutenant-General and cavalry commander. After a short preliminary campaign, the New Model Army justified its existence, and "the rebels' new brutish general", as the king called him, proved his capacity as commander-in-chief in the decisive Battle of Naseby (14 June 1645). The king fled to Wales. Fairfax besieged Leicester, and was successful at Taunton, Bridgwater and Bristol. The whole of the west was soon reduced.

Fairfax arrived in London on 12 November 1645. In his progress towards the capital he was accompanied by applauding crowds. Complimentary speeches and thanks were presented to him by both houses of parliament, along with a jewel of great value set with diamonds, and a sum of money. The king had returned from Wales and established himself at Oxford, where there was a strong garrison but, ever vacillating, he withdrew secretly, and proceeded to Newark to throw himself into the arms of the Scots Covenanter army there. Oxford capitulated in June 1646 following the final siege, and by the end of September 1646 Charles had neither army nor garrison in England, following the surrender of Thomas Blagge at Wallingford Castle after a siege conducted by Fairfax. In January 1647 the King was delivered up by the Covenanters to the commissioners of England's parliament. Fairfax met the king beyond Nottingham, and accompanied him during the journey to Holdenby, treating him with the utmost consideration in every way. "The general", said Charles, "is a man of honour, and keeps his word which he had pledged to me."

With the collapse of the Royalist cause came a confused period of negotiations between the Parliament and the King, between the King and the Scots, and between the Presbyterians and the Independents in and out of Parliament. In these negotiations the New Model Army soon began to take a most active part. The Lord General was placed in the unpleasant position of intermediary between his own officers and Parliament. In July the person of the King was seized by Cornet Joyce, a subaltern of cavalry—an act which sufficiently demonstrated the hopelessness of controlling the army by its Articles of War.

Fairfax was more at home in the field than at the head of a political committee, and, finding events too strong for him and that his officers were rallying around the more radical and politically shrewd Cromwell, he sought to resign his commission as commander-in-chief. He was, however, persuaded to retain it. He thus remained the titular chief of the army party, and with the greater part of its objects he was in complete, sometimes most active, sympathy. Shortly before the outbreak of the Second Civil War, Fairfax succeeded his father in the barony and in the office of governor of Hull. In the field against the English Royalists in 1648 he displayed his former energy and skill, and his operations culminated in the successful siege of Colchester, after the surrender of which place he approved the execution of the Royalist leaders Sir Charles Lucas and Sir George Lisle, holding that these officers had broken their parole. At the same time Cromwell's great victory of Preston crushed the faction of the Scots Covenanters who had made an engagement with the king, the Engagers.

John Milton, in a sonnet written during the siege of Colchester, called upon the Lord General to settle the kingdom, but the crisis was now at hand. Fairfax was in agreement with Cromwell and the army leaders in demanding the punishment of Charles, and he was still the effective head of the army. He approved, if he did not take an active part in, Pride's Purge (6 December 1648), but on the last and gravest of the questions at issue he set himself in deliberate and open opposition to the policy of the officers. He was placed at the head of the judges who were to try the King, and attended the preliminary sitting of the court, but absented himself after this.  The most likely explanation is that when he saw that they were serious about intending to execute the king he declined to have anything to do with this.

In calling over the court, when the crier pronounced the name of Fairfax, it is said that his wife, Anne Fairfax, shouted from the gallery that "he had more wit than to be there". Later when the court said that they were acting for "all the good people of England", she shouted "No, nor the hundredth part of them!". This resulted in an investigation and Anne was asked or required to leave the court. It was said that Anne could not forbear, as Bulstrode Whitelocke says, to exclaim aloud against the proceedings of the High Court of Justice. In February 1649 Fairfax was elected Member of Parliament for Cirencester in the Rump Parliament. Anne was later approached to intercede on the King's behalf to prevent his execution.

Fairfax's last service as Commander-in-chief was the suppression of the Leveller mutiny at Burford in May 1649. He had given his adhesion to the new order of things, and had been reappointed Lord General, but he merely administered the affairs of the army; when in 1650 Scots Covenanter Kirk Party eventually declared for Charles II, and the Council of State resolved to send an army to Scotland in order to prevent an invasion of England, Fairfax resigned his commission. Cromwell desired to see him continue as Commander-in-chief, as did those planning the war, but Fairfax could not support the war. Cromwell was appointed his successor, "Captain-general and Commander-in-chief of all the forces raised or to be raised at authority of Parliament within the Commonwealth of England."

Interregnum 

During the Commonwealth of England in 1654, Fairfax was elected MP for the newly created constituency of West Riding in the First Protectorate Parliament. He received a pension of £5,000 a year, and lived in retirement at his Yorkshire home of Nunappleton until after the death of the Lord Protector in 1658. Nunappleton and Fairfax's retirement there are the subject of Andrew Marvell's country house poem, Upon Appleton House. The troubles of the later Commonwealth recalled Lord Fairfax to political activity, and in 1659 he was elected MP for Yorkshire in the Third Protectorate Parliament.

Restoration 
For the last time Fairfax's appearance in arms helped to shape the future of the country, when George Monck invited him to assist in the operations about to be undertaken against John Lambert's army. In December 1659 he appeared at the head of a body of Yorkshire gentlemen, and such was the influence of Fairfax's name and reputation that 1,200 horse quit Lambert's colours and joined him. This was speedily followed by the breaking up of all Lambert's forces, and that day secured the restoration of the monarchy. For these actions, along with his honourable conduct in the civil war, he was spared from the wave of Royalist retributions. In April 1660 Fairfax was re-elected MP for Yorkshire in the Convention Parliament. He was put at the head of the commission appointed by the House of Commons to wait upon Charles II at the Hague and urge his speedy return. His actions assisted the Stuart Restoration. Fairfax provided the horse which Charles rode at his coronation.

Later life
The remaining eleven years of the life of Lord Fairfax were spent in retirement at his seat in Yorkshire. His wife died in 1665 and Fairfax died at Nun Appleton Priory in 1671. He was buried at Bilbrough, near York.

Bibliography
Fairfax had a taste for literature. He translated some of the Psalms, and wrote poems on solitude, the Christian warfare, the shortness of life, etc. During the last year or two of his life he wrote two Memorials which have been published—one on the northern actions in which he was engaged in 1642–44, and the other on some events in his tenure of the chief command. At York and at Oxford he endeavoured to save the libraries from pillage, and he enriched the Bodleian with some valuable manuscripts. His correspondence was edited by G.W. Johnson and published in 1848–49 in four volumes.

The metaphysical poet Andrew Marvell wrote "Upon Appleton House, To My Lord Fairfax", nominally about Fairfax's home, but also his character as well as England during his era.

Family

Fairfax married Hon. Anne de Vere, daughter of Horace Vere, 1st Baron Vere of Tilbury and Mary Tracy, on 20 June 1637. They had a daughter, Hon. Mary Fairfax (30 July 163820 October 1704), who married George Villiers, 2nd Duke of Buckingham.

Fairfax was succeeded as Lord Fairfax by a cousin, Henry Fairfax, 4th Lord Fairfax of Cameron.

Analysis
As a soldier he was exact and methodical in planning, in the heat of battle "so highly transported that scarce any one durst speak a word to him", chivalrous and punctilious in his dealings with his own men and the enemy. Honour and conscientiousness were equally the characteristics of his private and public character. But his modesty and distrust of his powers made him less effectual as a statesman than as a soldier, and above all he is placed at a disadvantage by being both in war and peace overshadowed by his associate Cromwell, who was politically talented and able to manipulate public antipathy against Charles to lead to his execution, something Fairfax never wanted.

In fiction
Fairfax, played by actor Dougray Scott, is a pivotal character in the 2003 film To Kill a King, as well as in Rosemary Sutcliff's 1953 historical fiction Simon, being portrayed as inspiring and fair. He also appears as a central character in Sutcliff's 1959 novel The Rider of the White Horse, which gives an account of the early stage of the Civil War from the point of view of his wife, and in Howard Brenton's 2012 play 55 Days. Douglas Wilmer portrayed him in the 1970 Ken Hughes film Cromwell. He was played by Jerome Willis in the 1975 historical film Winstanley. He appears in Michael Arnold's novel Marston Moor, which includes an account of Fairfax's adventures in the eponymous battle. He was also a central character, played by Nigel Anthony, in the 1988 BBC Radio production of Don Taylor's play God's Revolution.

Notes

Citations

References

  cites
 
 
 
 
 
 .

Attribution:
 
 

|-

|-

 
|- 

|-

|-

1612 births
1671 deaths
17th-century English nobility
Alumni of St John's College, Cambridge
Burials in North Yorkshire
English military personnel of the Eighty Years' War
English MPs 1648–1653
English MPs 1654–1655
English MPs 1659
English MPs 1660
Thomas
New Model Army generals
Roundheads
Lords of Parliament (pre-1707)
Lords Fairfax of Cameron
Monarchs of the Isle of Man
Parliamentarian military personnel of the English Civil War
People from the Borough of Harrogate
Military personnel from Yorkshire